The Nottingham Wildcats are an English women's basketball club based in Nottingham, England. The Wildcats compete in the Women's British Basketball League (WBBL).

History
The Wildcats were established in 1976 and are the biggest women's basketball club in Nottingham.   The team is run by the Nottingham Wildcats Community Basketball and Sports Trust.  The Wildcats are one of only a handful of British basketball clubs to administer and run their own facility, the Nottingham Wildcats Arena, which opened in 2001. 

A perennially successful team in the English Women's Basketball League, the Wildcats were one of the founder members of the Women's British Basketball League in 2014.

Home Venue
Dayncourt School
Portland Leisure Centre
Nottingham Wildcats Arena (2001-present)

Season-by-season records

Players

Current roster

Honours
WBBL Championship (2): 2015-16, 2016-17 
WBBL Cup (1): 2017-18

See also
Nottingham Hoods

References

Women's basketball teams in England
Women's sports teams in England
Women's British Basketball League teams
Sport in Nottingham
1976 establishments in England
Basketball teams established in 1976